Missing (stylized as missing.) is a 1982 biographical drama film directed by Costa-Gavras from a screenplay written by Gavras and Donald E. Stewart, adapted from the book The Execution of Charles Horman: An American Sacrifice (1978) by Thomas Hauser (later republished under the title Missing in 1982), based on the disappearance of American journalist Charles Horman, in the aftermath of the United States-backed Chilean coup of 1973, which deposed the democratically elected socialist President Salvador Allende.

It stars Jack Lemmon, Sissy Spacek, Melanie Mayron, John Shea, Janice Rule and Charles Cioffi. Set largely during the days and weeks following Horman's disappearance, the film examines the relationship between Horman's wife Beth and his father Edmund and their subsequent quest to find Horman.

Missing was theatrically released on February 12, 1982 to critical acclaim and modest commercial success, grossing $16 million on a $9.5 million budget. The film premiered at the 1982 Cannes Film Festival where it was jointly awarded the Palme d'Or (along with the Turkish film Yol), while Lemmon won the Best Actor prize. It received four nominations at the 55th Academy Awards; Best Picture, Best Actor (for Lemmon), Best Actress (for Spacek) and won Best Adapted Screenplay. The film created significant controversy in Chile and was banned during Augusto Pinochet's dictatorship, even though neither Chile nor Pinochet is ever mentioned by name (although the Chilean cities of Viña del Mar and Santiago are).

Plot
Ed Horman (Jack Lemmon) arrives in Chile to search for his son Charlie (John Shea), who worked as a journalist and disappeared during the recent military coup. Ed meets his daughter-in-law, Beth (Sissy Spacek), with whom he has a strained relationship and they fight over politics. Ed blames his son and daughter-in-law's radical political views for Charlie's disappearance, while Beth blames the American government. Ed uses his connections to meet with various government officials to find out the truth about his son's disappearance.

As he investigates, Ed finds that the American embassy is not as helpful as he thought they would be and he suspects them of hiding information about Charlie. One U.S. diplomat is polite and friendly but constantly lies to him; a high-ranking American military attache is blunt and tells Ed that whatever happened to Charlie was his own fault, noting "You play with fire, you get burned." Together, he and Beth learn that the U.S. had many interests in the country that have been enhanced by the coup and its aftermath and that many military officials aided Pinochet in the coup. As Ed becomes disillusioned with the American government, he comes to respect the work Beth and Charlie were doing and he and Beth reconcile. When they receive proof that Charlie was murdered by the junta and that the U.S. let it happen, he tells the embassy officials "I just thank God we live in a country where we can still put people like you in jail!"

The film ends with a postscript stating that after his return to the United States, Ed received the body of his son Charlie seven months later, making an autopsy impossible, and that a subsequent lawsuit against the US government was dismissed. It also adds that the State Department denies its involvement in the Pinochet coup, a position maintained to the present day.

Cast

Production
The film was shot in Mexico with a budget of $9.5 million from Universal Studios, marking Costa-Gavras' most expensive production.

Soundtrack
The score is by the Greek electronic composer Vangelis. The movie's piano theme has been used extensively in commercials, but an official release of the film's soundtrack has not yet occurred. The main theme appeared first on Vangelis' 1989 album Themes. A 45rpm single of the title track backed with Eric's Theme from Chariots Of Fire was also released by Polydor in 1989. The main theme is also available on the Festival de Cannes (60th Anniversary) compilation of famous soundtracks. A bootleg release of the soundtrack exists. A sung version with lyrics by Tim Rice has been recorded by Elaine Paige and Nana Mouskouri.

Release
Missing was released in theaters on February 12, 1982, in limited theaters and was released widely on March 12, 1982, in 733 theaters. It ranked at #3 at the box office, grossing $2.3 million. In its first week, it grossed $5.5 million. In its second weekend, it landed at #5, making $1.8 million. For its second week, it made $2.3 million. After 49 days and 7 weeks in theaters, the film made between $14 and $16 million in the US.
 
The film was released on both VHS and Laserdisc, in 1982 and 1987, by MCA Videocassette, MCA Videodisc, and MCA Home Video respectively. The VHS version was pulled from the market due to the lawsuit filed against director Costa-Gavras. Universal Home Video re-released Missing on DVD in 2004, following the dismissal of the lawsuit. A special edition DVD was released by The Criterion Collection in October 2008.

Lawsuit
In 1983, a year after the film's theatrical release, both the film (then in the home video market) and Thomas Hauser's book The Execution of Charles Horman were removed from the United States market following a lawsuit filed against Costa-Gavras and Universal Pictures's (then) parent company MCA by former ambassador Nathaniel Davis and two others for libel. A lawsuit against Hauser himself was dismissed because the statute of limitations had expired. Davis and his associates lost their lawsuit, after which the film was re-released by Universal in 2006.

Reception

Reviews

Roger Ebert gave the film three stars, writing that while the film was being cited for courage in criticism of the U.S. government, the criticism was clouded by its direction, but the best scenes were where Lemmon and Spacek's character were bogged down by the embassy's "niceties" in their search:By the time Missing begins its crucial last half-hour, a strange thing has happened. We care about this dead American, and his wife and father, almost despite the movie. The performances of Spacek and Lemmon carry us along through the movie's undisciplined stylistic displays.
Vincent Canby, writing for The New York Times, positively reviewed the film's message and Ricardo Aronovich's cinematography.

The American filmmaker Wes Anderson listed Missing as one of his favorite films.

In his 2015 Movie Guide, Leonard Maltin awarded Missing three and a half stars, highlighting Lemmon's acting and crediting Costa-Gavras as a skilled director. The film has a 94% approval rating on Rotten Tomatoes, based on 32 reviews with the consensus: "Thanks in large part to strong performances from Sissy Spacek and Jack Lemmon, Missing is both a gripping character exploration and an effective political thriller."

Accolades
Missing won the Palme d'Or (Golden Palm) at the 1982 Cannes Film Festival, while Lemmon was awarded Best Actor for his performance.

See also
 Forced disappearance
 1973 Chilean coup d'état
 Operation Condor (also known as Plan Condor)

References

Further reading

External links

 
 
 
 
 
 Missing: “Who Would Care About Us If We Disappeared?” An essay by Michael Wood at the Criterion Collection.

Charles Horman
1982 films
1980s thriller drama films
American political thriller films
Mexican thriller films
1980s English-language films
1980s Spanish-language films
American docudrama films
Films about the Chilean military dictatorship
Films based on non-fiction books
Films about missing people
Films directed by Costa Gavras
Films scored by Vangelis
Films whose writer won the Best Adapted Screenplay Academy Award
Palme d'Or winners
Films set in Chile
Films set in 1973
Films shot in Mexico
Estudios Churubusco films
Enforced disappearance
Political repression in Chile during the military government (1973–1990)
Political films based on actual events
Films whose writer won the Best Screenplay BAFTA Award
PolyGram Filmed Entertainment films
Films shot in Mexico City
1980s political films
1982 drama films
Biographical films about journalists
Films about coups d'état
1980s American films